Ragnall Ua Flainn Chua (anglicised Reginald O'Flanua) was Bishop of Emly from when Emly Cathedral was burnt down in 1192 until his death in 1197.

References

12th-century Roman Catholic bishops in Ireland
Bishops of Elphin